Phillippus Jacobus Mostert (30 October 1898 – 3 October 1972) was a South African rugby union player and 16th captain of the South Africa national rugby union team. He predominantly played in the forwards as prop, but could also play lock.

Early life
Mostert was born 30 October 1898, Krugersdorp, South Africa. His father joined the Boer forces to fight for South African independence, and was killed in the Battle of Colenso, Natal, during the Second Boer War (15 December 1899). Mostert, his mother (Anna Francina Mostert) and 7 siblings (Martha, Gerbrecht, Johanna, Catherina, Francois, Frederik and Willem) were removed from their family farm in Krugersdorp (2 May 1901) and placed in a camp and remained there until the end of the war (15 October 1902). After release from the concentration camp, Mostert and his family moved down to the Western Cape to live with his maternal aunt.

Career
Mostert started playing rugby at the age of thirteen and joined Somerset West RFC, where he was selected for the first team in 1918. Later he captained the team for nine seasons in a row, from 1923 to 1931.

He also competed in the Currie Cup competitions of 1925 and 1927, and during the 1927 competition he scored six tries and kicked a drop goal. In 1929 Mostert captained Western Province, which again won the Cup.

Mostert debuted for the Springboks on 13 August 1921, against New Zealand in Dunedin.  He played as tighthead prop in the first and second test matches and then moved to hooker for the third test. The second test series in which Mostert played was the 1924 test series against the touring team from the British Isles. During the second test in the series, he scored his first and only test try.

In 1928 New Zealand toured South Africa and Mostert was named captain of the Springboks. He played twice as a loosehead prop and twice as hooker in the test series which was shared 2 all by the teams. In 1931–32 Mostert toured with the Springboks to Britain and Ireland, playing last international match against Scotland at Murrayfield on 16 January 1932.

Overall Mostert played 14 international games, winning 10, losing 3 and drawing 1. He also played in 26 tour matches, scoring four tries.

After his playing days, Mostert coached and acted as selector in the Western Province and in 1965 he was elected an honorary life member of the Western Province RFU.

Test history

See also
List of South Africa national rugby union players – Springbok no. 176

References

1898 births
1972 deaths
South African rugby union players
South Africa international rugby union players
Rugby union props
Rugby union players from Gauteng
Western Province (rugby union) players